Old Girlfriends and Other Horrible Memories is an album by American fingerstyle guitarist and composer John Fahey, released in 1992. It also marked the end of an era for Fahey, who would soon be involved in a downward spiral in his personal life, health and career.

Reception

Allmusic critic Richard Meyer gave the album a 3 of 5 stars review, writing "All his trademark elements are here, eclectic song choices, dark and precise playing and a sense of fun." CMJ New Music wrote that "...the mood on Old Girlfriends is one that finds comfort in a certain melancholia and longing spirit rather than dwelling on darker hues. That Fahey can evoke all these emotions with just an acoustic guitar proves the power possible behind simplicity, how one instrument can captivate with only feeling, and in this case memories, providing the motivation."

Track listing
All songs by John Fahey unless otherwise noted.
 "Twilight Time" (Buck Ram, Morty Nevins, Al Nevins) – 2:30
 "The Sea of Love" (Phillip Baptiste, George Khoury) – 2:04
 "In Darkest Night: The Objectification and Recurrent Sightings of Bizarre and Cathected Screen Memories (from below) Along the Sligo" – 4:00
 "Blueberry Hill" (Vincent Rose, Larry Stock, Al Lewis) – 2:40
 "A Rose and a Baby Ruth" (John D. Loudermilk) – 2:02
 "Claire" – 3:13
 "The Thing at the End of New Hampshire Avenue" – 3:29
 "Don't" – 3:13
 "View" – 4:13
 "Dianne Kelly" – 7:40
 "Fear & Loathing at 4th & Butternut" – 3:29
 "Twilight on Prince Georges Avenue" – 4:06

Personnel
John Fahey – guitar
Terry Robb – 1st guitar on "Twilight Time"
Melody Fahey – ukulele on "A Rose and a Baby Ruth"
Production notes
John Fahey– producer
Terry Robb – producer
Joan Bone – engineer
Glenn Jones – assistant engineer
Randy Kling – mastering
Scott Billington – design
Levoy Exil – cover art

References

1992 albums
John Fahey (musician) albums
Albums produced by John Fahey (musician)